Heraldo Bezerra Nuñez, (21 April 1945 – 14 March 1977) was a Spanish footballer who played for Esporte Clube Cruzeiro, RS. Despite being born in São Jerônimo, Brazil, he was a Spanish citizen and played at the international level with Spain. He played against Turkey, in a 0–0 tie in 1973. 
He played together with Ayala and Garate in a famous forward line known as the three daggers.
He played 102 games in the La Liga scoring 16 goals. 
Shortly after being transferred from Atletico Madrid to Boca Juniors at the beginning of the Argentine season, Bezerra died in a car accident near Campana on March 14, 1977, while travelling to Rosario accompanying teammate Ruben Favret, who survived without injuries.

Titles

National competitions

 2 Spanish First Division titles (Atlético: 1972–1973, and 1976–1977)
 2 Copa del Rey titles (Atlético in 1972 and 1976)

International competitions

 1 Intercontinental Cup (Atlético Madrid in 1974)

See also
List of Spain international footballers born outside Spain

References

 BDFA profile

External links

1945 births
1977 deaths
Spanish footballers
Spain international footballers
Brazilian emigrants to Spain
Brazilian footballers
Atlético Madrid footballers
Boca Juniors footballers
Cruzeiro Esporte Clube players
Newell's Old Boys footballers
La Liga players
Argentine Primera División players
Expatriate footballers in Argentina
Road incident deaths in Argentina
Association football forwards